Live From CBGB is a live album by Living Colour recorded live on December 19, 1989 at the CBGB club, but not released until January 11, 2005 by Epic Records.  This concert was the band's homecoming after experiencing worldwide success with the studio album Vivid throughout 1988 and 1989.

The show features a wealth of new material that would soon be released on their Grammy winning follow-up album Time's Up the following year. This album is the only Living Colour album to feature "Soldier's Blues," "Little Lies," and a cover of the Bad Brains classic "Sailin' On."

Track listing

Personnel
 Corey Glover - lead vocals
 Vernon Reid - guitar, backing vocals
 Muzz Skillings - bass, backing vocals
 Will Calhoun - drums, backing vocals, percussion

References

Living Colour albums
2005 live albums
Albums recorded at CBGB